Burkina Faso competed at the 2019 World Athletics Championships in Doha, Qatar, from 27 September to 6 October 2019.

Medalists

Results

Men
Track and road events

Field events

Women
Combined events – Heptathlon

References

Nations at the 2019 World Athletics Championships
World Championships in Athletics
Burkina Faso at the World Championships in Athletics